Acton is a hamlet in the parish of Langton Matravers, on the Isle of Purbeck, in the county of Dorset in the south of England. The hamlet of Acton was built as living quarters for the quarrymen working at the local quarries.

The name “Acton” is derived from the Old English for “farm for young sheep”, the first element of which is *tacca. The hamlet was documented in the Domesday Book as Tacatone.

Notable people

Philosopher Michael Oakeshott retired to Acton in 1968, eventually dying in the hamlet, aged 89, in 1990.

References

External links
 
 

Villages in Dorset
Isle of Purbeck